Talovsky (masculine), Talovskaya (feminine), or Talovskoye (neuter) may refer to:
Talovsky District, a district of Voronezh Oblast, Russia
Talovsky (rural locality), a rural locality (a khutor) in Volgograd Oblast, Russia
Talovskoye, a rural locality (a selo) in Omsk Oblast, Russia